Denis Istomin was the defending champion, but chose not to compete.
Igor Kunitsyn won the title, defeating Dzmitry Zhyrmont 7–6(12–10), 6–2 in the final.

Seeds

Draw

Finals

Top half

Bottom half

References
 Main draw
 Qualifying draw

2012 ATP Challenger Tour
Karshi Challenger